The following is a list of banks in Iceland.

Contemporary banks

Central 

 Central Bank of Iceland

Commercial 

 Arion Bank (formerly known as New Kaupthing)
 Íslandsbanki (formerly known as New Glitnir)
 Landsbankinn (formerly known as New Landsbanki)
 Kvika banki

Investment 
 Kvika banki

Defunct banks 

 Askar Capital (privately owned)
 Búnaðarbanki (merged with Kaupthing, became KB Bank and later Kaupthing Bank)
 Glitnir (previously government-owned, privatized, went back into government hands during the Icelandic financial crisis)
 Iðnaðarbanki (merged with Útvegsbanki, Alþýðubanki, Verzlunarbanki and Samvinnubanki)
 Íslandsbanki (First Íslandsbanki was founded in 1904, went bankrupt during the Great Depression. Second Íslandsbanki came into existence when the government owned banks Útvegsbanki, Samvinnubanki, Iðnaðarbanki and Verslunarbanki merged. Íslandsbanki was later re-branded as Glitnir Bank, which was taken into government administration late 2008. The third Íslandsbanki emerged on 20. February 2009 when the government-owned Glitnir Bank was re-branded as Íslandsbanki.)
 Kaupthing Bank (previously government-owned, privatized, went back into government hands during the Icelandic financial crisis)
 Landsbanki (previously government-owned, privatized, went back into government hands during the Icelandic financial crisis)
 Samvinnubanki (merged with Iðnaðarbanki, Alþýðubanki, Verzlunarbanki and Útvegsbanki)
 Saga Investment Bank
 SPB hf (formerly Icebank) <http://www.straumur.com/media/spb-frettir/Creditor_s-Report-September-2014.pdf.
 Útvegsbanki (merged with Iðnaðarbanki, Alþýðubanki, Verzlunarbanki and Samvinnubanki)
 Verzlunarbanki (merged with Útvegsbanki, Alþýðubanki, Iðnaðarbanki and Samvinnubanki)

See also 

 Economy of Iceland

 
Banks
Iceland
Iceland